The 2002–03 season will be Ferencvárosi TC's101st competitive season, 101st consecutive season in the Borsodi Liga and 103rd year in existence as a football club.

Transfers

Summer 

In:

Out:

Winter 

In:

Out:

Nemzeti Bajnokság I

First stage

Second stage

Results summary

Results by round

Matches

First stage

Hungarian Cup

UEFA Cup

Qualifying round

Statistics

Appearances and goals
Last updated on 31 May 2003.

|}

Top scorers
Includes all competitive matches. The list is sorted by shirt number when total goals are equal.
Last updated on 31 May 2003.

Disciplinary record
Includes all competitive matches. Players with 1 card or more included only.

Last updated on 31 May 2003.

Overall
{|class="wikitable"
|-
|Games played || 43 (32 Nemzeti Bajnokság I, 5 Hungarian Cup and 6 UEFA Cup)
|-
|Games won || 26 (19 Nemzeti Bajnokság I, 4 Hungarian Cup and 3 UEFA Cup)
|-
|Games drawn || 9 (7 Nemzeti Bajnokság I, 1 Hungarian Cup and 1 UEFA Cup)
|-
|Games lost || 8 (6 Nemzeti Bajnokság I, 0 Hungarian Cup and 2 UEFA Cup)
|-
|Goals scored || 70
|-
|Goals conceded || 33
|-
|Goal difference || +37
|-
|Yellow cards || 75
|-
|Red cards || 5
|-
|rowspan="1"|Worst discipline ||  Attila Kriston (10 , 0 )
|-
|rowspan="4"|Best result || 4–0 (H) v Kispest-Honvéd - (Nemzeti Bajnokság I) - 3-8-2002
|-
| 4–0 (H) v AEL Limassol - (UEFA Cup) - 15-8-2002
|-
| 4–0 (H) v Kocaelispor - (UEFA Cup) - 19-9-2002
|-
| 4–0 (H) v Siófok - (Nemzeti Bajnokság I) - 25-10-2002
|-
|rowspan="1"|Worst result || 0–3 (A) v Újpest - (Nemzeti Bajnokság I) - 14-9-2002
|-
|rowspan="2"|Most appearances ||  Lajos Szűcs (42 appearances)
|-
|  Péter Lipcsei (42 appearances)
|-
|rowspan="1"|Top scorer ||  Attila Tököli (26 goals)
|-
|Points || 87/129 (67.44%)
|-

References

External links
 Official Website
 UEFA
 fixtures and results

2002-03
Hungarian football clubs 2002–03 season